Bernard Charles Tighe (January 21, 1927 – December 13, 2004) was an American lawyer who served as the 29th Lieutenant Governor of North Dakota of 1965–1969, serving under Governor William L. Guy.

Background
Born in Fargo, North Dakota, Tighe graduated from Fargo High School. He went to the University of Notre Dame briefly and then served in the United States Navy. He then received his bachelors and law degrees from the University of North Dakota and was admitted to the North Dakota bar. He then practiced law. He served as the Lieutenant Governor of North Dakota in 1965-1969 as a Democrat. He died in Bismarck, North Dakota.

Notes

External links

1927 births
2004 deaths
Politicians from Fargo, North Dakota
University of Notre Dame alumni
University of North Dakota alumni
North Dakota lawyers
North Dakota Democrats
Lieutenant Governors of North Dakota
20th-century American politicians
Lawyers from Fargo, North Dakota
20th-century American lawyers